Alan Malcolm Chesney (born 28 April 1949) is a British-born New Zealand field hockey player. He lived in Christchurch and lives in Durban South Africa. He won a gold medal at the 1976 Summer Olympics in Montreal.

References

External links

1949 births
Living people
English emigrants to New Zealand
New Zealand male field hockey players
Olympic field hockey players of New Zealand
Field hockey players at the 1976 Summer Olympics
Olympic gold medalists for New Zealand
Olympic medalists in field hockey
Medalists at the 1976 Summer Olympics